Julia H. Scott (Kinney; November 4, 1809 – March 5, 1842) was an American author who had the distinction of being the Poet of Sheshequin. She wrote numerous articles of prose and poetry, which were published in many of the most popular literary periodicals in the U.S. She was a prominent literary figure in the Universalist religion, along with Sarah Carter Edgarton Mayo and Caroline Mehitable Fisher Sawyer.

Biography
Julia Hutchinson Kinney was born in Sheshequin, Bradford County, Pennsylvania, November 4, 1809. Her parents were George Kinney (d. 1862) and Mary Carner Kinney (1787-1863). Her siblings were George Wayne, Horace, Newcomb, W. Wallace, O. H. Perry, Mary, and Somers.

Before marriage, Scott wrote many fugitive pieces for the periodicals, in prose and verse. She wrote more considerably for the religious magazines and journals of her own order (Universalist) of which she was an eminent member. Without possessing remarkable powers of fancy or delineation, and avoiding the portrayal or excitement of stern passion, her writings were prized for their purity, sweetness, and piety. She also contributed to purely literary periodicals. Her poems were collected and two editions published.

Scott taught school in Towanda, Pennsylvania, and that is where she met Dr. David L. Scott. They married on May 2, 1835, in Sheshequin.

Death and legacy
Scott died of consumption in Towanda, March 5, 1842, in her thirty-third year.

After her death, a volume of her Poems was published, with a memoir by Sarah Carter Edgarton Mayo.

The first Sunday school in Sheshequin was conducted in 1830 by Scott. A tablet on the Universalist Church in Bradford County on Route 354 commemorates this fact and includes the names of other people associated with this church.

Selected works
Her publications include:
 The sacrifice: a clergyman's story, 1834
 Poems, 1843
 Memoir, 1860

References

Attribution

Bibliography

Further reading
 Memoir of Mrs. Julia H. Scott: With Her Poems and Selections from Her Prose, by Julia H. Kinney Scott, Caroline Mehetabel Fisher Sawyer (1860)

External links

 
 The Julia Scott Memoir Controversy, by Katie Replogle, February 25, 2017, at Unitarian Universalist Church of Athens and Sheshequin

1809 births
1842 deaths
19th-century American poets
19th-century American women writers
People from Bradford County, Pennsylvania
19th-century deaths from tuberculosis
Tuberculosis deaths in Pennsylvania